The Memphis tanker truck disaster was a transportation disaster that occurred on December 23, 1988, when a tractor-trailer tanker truck hauling liquefied propane crashed on an exit ramp at the Interstate 40/Interstate 240 (I-40/I-240) interchange in downtown Memphis, Tennessee. The crash ruptured the tank, causing the leaking gas to ignite, which produced a large  explosion that set multiple vehicles and structures on fire. The tank was then propelled  from the site where it crashed into a residential complex and started additional fires. The accident resulted in nine deaths and ten injuries. The interchange where the accident occurred was considered unsafe and poorly designed, and had been the site of several previous accidents. It was completely rebuilt in the 2000s.

Background
The accident occurred at the interchange in Midtown Memphis between I-40 and the western terminus of I-240. Approaching this interchange from the west, I-40 travels in an east–west alignment and shifts into a north–south alignment at this interchange. I-240 also meets the interchange from a north–south alignment. The interchange was first constructed in the latter 1960s, and opened to traffic on July 14, 1971. At this time, it was planned as a four-way interchange; I-40 was to continue straight through the interchange in an east–west alignment, and I-240 was to continue north of the interchange on what is now I-40. Many residents opposed the routing east of this interchange because it was slated to pass through Overton Park, and filed a series of lawsuits to stop the interstate's construction. These lawsuits culminated in the 1971 U.S. Supreme Court case Citizens to Preserve Overton Park v. Volpe, and in 1981, the Tennessee Department of Transportation (TDOT) abandoned plans to route I-40 east of this interchange. Instead, the department chose to redesignate the northern loop of I-240 north of this interchange as part of I-40. As a result of these original plans, however, the interchange was constructed as a four-way combination interchange, and contained several unused ramps and bridges intended to carry traffic to and from I-40 east of the interchange. I-40 traffic continuing both through the interchange and exiting onto I-240 was required to use one-lane ramps, some of which contained hazardously sharp curves. At the time of the accident, the entire interchange was considered one of the most dangerous in the state and had a crash rate much higher than the state average. TDOT had begun preliminary work in early 1988 for a project to reconstruct the interchange, estimated to cost $100 million at the time (equivalent to $ in ).

Accident
On December 23, 1988, at approximately 10:15 a.m. Central Time, the semi-trailer truck skidded off of a ramp carrying traffic on I-40 eastbound at the Midtown interchange in Memphis, rolled about 1 1/4 times, and crashed into a retaining wall at the base of an overpass. The crash resulted in a small hole being punctured in the front end of the tank, and the leaking propane quickly enveloped both sides of the interstate in a vapor cloud. This set nearby vehicles and buildings on fire and instantly killed five motorists, including the driver of the truck. This instantly killed an occupant of the complex and started a fire which subsequently spread to multiple other buildings and cars. At the same time the tank became airborne, most of the tractor was propelled into the southbound lanes of I-40. Other parts of the truck, including tires and an axle, were hurled from the crash site into nearby homes. The crash created a traffic jam that extended several miles in all directions, and about one hour after the crash, a truck on I-240 northbound crashed into stopped vehicles at the south end of the traffic congestion, killing the driver. In addition to the truck, a total of seven other cars were completely destroyed by the explosion. Ten other cars, seven houses, and one industrial building were damaged by the explosion and subsequent fires. A total of 10 people were injured, and two people who were inside of homes impacted by the crash died the following day from their injuries. Several of the injured were treated for severe burns, and some of the deceased victims were burned beyond recognition.

Investigation and aftermath

Investigators from the National Transportation Safety Board arrived on the scene the following day. They determined that the truck had passed an inspection in Arkansas the day before the accident, and that the driver was familiar with the route.

Authorities identified the deceased motorists as Randall Benson (29, driver of the tanker truck) of West Memphis, Arkansas, Harrison G. Lee (34) of Brighton, Tennessee, Robert Wardlow (40) of Memphis, Tina Wiles (30) and Warner Wiles (70), both of Vicksburg, Mississippi, and David Bailey (29, driver of second truck) of West Helena, Arkansas. Shelanda Towles (10), Iva J. Rubesheim (87), and James M. Malone (57) were identified as the deceased occupants of the homes which were impacted by the blast.

The National Fire Protection Agency (NFPA) investigated the accident and released its report on February 6, 1990. The report determined that the exact cause of both the explosion and the leakage that caused the explosion were unknown, but theorized the ignition might have started in a house that the vapor cloud had expanded into, and that the tank may have been punctured by a vertical guardrail post when the truck was rolling.

Between June 2003 and December 2006, TDOT spent $53 million to completely reconstruct the interchange where the accident occurred. The unused ramps and bridges were demolished, and the interchange was converted into a directional T interchange. In addition, the interchange with SR 14 (Jackson Avenue) on I-40 directly north of the interchange was modified, and multiple auxiliary lanes and slip ramps were constructed to improve traffic flow and reduce crashes caused by sudden lane changes. Before the project could begin, TDOT had to acquire additional right-of-way, which was opposed by some residents of the area. This subsequently delayed the start of the project by several years.

See also
Waverly, Tennessee tank car explosion

References

1988 disasters in the United States
1988 road incidents
December 1988 events in the United States
1988 in Tennessee
Explosions in 1988
Gas explosions in the United States
Interstate 40
Transportation disasters in Tennessee
Road incidents in the United States
Transportation in Memphis, Tennessee
History of Memphis, Tennessee
Tanker explosions
Fires in Tennessee